Sterculia apetala, commonly known as the Panama tree, camoruco, manduvi tree or anacagüita, is a species of flowering plants in the family Malvaceae. It is found in Central and South America, as well as the Caribbean islands. Sterculia apetala is recognized as the national tree of the Republic of Panama.

Description 
Sterculia apetala is perennial and deciduous. Trunks are straight, cylindrical, and have large buttresses at the base. Height ranges from 20–40 meters.

Leaves are alternate, palmate with five lobes, and cluster densely at the end of branches. Including the petiole, leaf length ranges from 15-50 centimeters.

Flowers are purple and yellow, and have five sepals. S. apetala flowers have no petals; structures that resemble them are in fact sepals. Flower diameter ranges between 2.5-3.5 centimeters. These flowers are unisexual, meaning there are distinct male and female individuals used for reproduction.

Fruit are compounds of up to five follicles, stemming from peduncles that can reach as long as 30 centimeters. Inside the follicles are seeds, as well as orange urticating hairs that may cause pain when touched. Naturally, the tree typically flowers and bears fruit between December and March.

Seeds are black ellipsoids, typically with the dimensions 2.5 x 1.5 centimeters. These seeds contain sterculic acid and malvalic acid, two types of cyclopropene fatty acids. Antioxidant compounds can be obtained from the seeds via continuous or batch extractions using water or ethanol as solvents.

Taxonomy and nomenclature 
Sterculia apetala belongs to the genus Sterculia, classified under the mallow family Malvaceae. Apetala is one of 150 known species of Sterculia.

The generic name Sterculia is derived from the Latin word "stercus", which translates to "excrement".  This is because of the strong odor characteristic of flowers and leaves within this genus.

Distribution 
Sterculia apetala is found in the tropical regions of Bermuda, Mexico, Barbados, Belize, Cuba, El Salvador, Guatemala, Honduras, Jamaica, Montserrat, Panama, Puerto Rico, Saint Kitts and Nevis, Trinidad and Tobago, Bolivia, Brazil, Colombia, Ecuador, Peru, and Venezuela.

Uses 
Wood from Sterculia apetala is used to produce cases, crates, industrial and domestic woodware, canoes, and tool handles. The tree is often grown for shade, resulting from its large leaves. In some regions, seeds are consumed after being boiled or roasted, used to flavor chocolate, or given to animals as fodder. The flowers are used as antitussive.

Conservation 
In the Pantanal wetlands of Central Brazil, the endangered hyacinth macaw (Anodorhynchus hyacinthinus) makes its nest almost exclusively in the natural hollows of S. apetala.

Gallery

References

External links
 
 

apetala
Trees of Peru